Mayfield, Scotland can refer to:

 Mayfield, Edinburgh
 Mayfield, Midlothian